Missy Warren McGee (born March 31, 1966) is an American politician, representing the 102nd district in the Mississippi House of Representatives since 2017.

Early life and education 
McGee was born on March 31, 1966 in Hattiesburg, Mississippi and attended Hattiesburg High School. Afterwards, she enrolled at the University of Southern Mississippi, where she graduated with a bachelor of science degree in speech communication. She earned her master's degree in speech communication from the same alma mater. After graduation, she worked as a Legislative Assistant for Congressman Trent Lott in Washington D.C. She moved back to Mississippi and has worked as an instructor for speech communication at the University of Southern Mississippi.

Career 
McGee decided to run in a special election to fulfill the last two years of the outgoing Representative Toby Barker who was elected Mayor of Hattiesburg. In the special election, she ran against three others: Cory Ferraez, Casey Mercier, and Kathryn Rehner, all listed without party labels. McGee and Rehner advanced to a runoff after receiving the most votes of the four candidates, with McGee receiving about 45% of the vote and Rehner 24%. McGee won the run-off with 2,110 votes to 1,000 votes, a 67.8%–32.2% margin. She was sworn in on October 13, 2017. Then-Republican Governor Phil Bryant issued a congratulatory statement to McGee in response to the win.

The election win was notable for two reasons. First, McGee is the second women to hold the District 102 seat, with the last being Evelyn Gandy, former Lieutenant Governor of Mississippi. Secondly, it allowed Republicans to maintain a supermajority in the Mississippi House. Although McGee was listed as independent on the ticket, McGee was supported by Republicans while her main contender, Rehner, was supported by Democrats. Once elected, McGee listed herself as Republican and emphasized her moderate viewpoints, stating "This is not about party to me."

McGee ran unopposed in the 2019 Republican primary election, and, in the general election, she faced off against Brandon Rue. McGee won with 65.04% of the vote.

For the 2021 House session, McGee serves as the Vice-Chair for the Public Health and Human Services committee and on the following other committees: Apportionment and Elections, Medicaid, Transportation, and Universities and Colleges.

Political positions 
During the 2017 election, McGee campaigned on improving the public school system, infrastructure, and reducing brain drain.

McGee was the only Republican to vote against a 2019 heartbeat abortion bill. Although she voted yes to a 15-week abortion ban in 2018, McGee emphasized that she couldn't support the bill, stating, "...[I] cannot support legislation that makes such hard line, final decisions for other women."

In 2020, McGee voted yes on the bill to change the Mississippi State Flag.

Personal life 
McGee is married to her husband Sean McGee and has two sons. They are Methodist.

References 

1966 births
21st-century American politicians
Living people
University of Southern Mississippi alumni
Republican Party members of the Mississippi House of Representatives
Women state legislators in Mississippi
People from Hattiesburg, Mississippi
21st-century American women politicians